Bruno Grougi (born 26 April 1983) is a Martiniquais former professional footballer who played as a midfielder. He made three appearances for the Martinique national team.

Career statistics
Scores and results list Martinique's goal tally first, score column indicates score after each Grougi goal.

References

External links
 
 

1983 births
Living people
French people of Martiniquais descent
French footballers
Martiniquais footballers
Footballers from Caen
Association football midfielders
France youth international footballers
Martinique international footballers
Ligue 1 players
Ligue 2 players
Championnat National players
Stade Malherbe Caen players
AS Cherbourg Football players
Clermont Foot players
Stade Brestois 29 players